Daniel Bonchev Yordanov (born 1 January 1967) is a Bulgarian rower.

Yordanov was born in Stanke Dimitrov in 1967. He won a gold medal at the 1987 World Rowing Championships in Copenhagen partnered with Vasil Radev in the men's double sculls. Radev and Yordanov competed at the 1988 Summer Olympics in Seoul in double sculls where they came eighth.

References

1967 births
Living people
Bulgarian male rowers
World Rowing Championships medalists for Bulgaria
Olympic rowers of Bulgaria
Rowers at the 1988 Summer Olympics